Ellen Wittlinger (October 21, 1948 – November 17, 2022) was an American author of young adults novels, including Gracie's Girl and the Printz Honor book Hard Love.

Biography 
Ellen Wittlinger went to college at Millikin University in Decatur, Illinois. She received her MFA from the Iowa Writers' Workshop at the University of Iowa and lived in western Massachusetts. She published a book of poetry, Breakers, in 1979. Wittlinger had two fellowship years in Provincetown at the Fine Arts Work Center and worked for a local newspaper, The Provincetown Advocate. One of Wittlinger's plays won the author's prize at the annual Eastern Massachusetts Association of Community Theaters competition. Her first novel for young adults, Lombardo's Law, was published in 1993.

Wittlinger died on November 17, 2022, at the age of 74.

Selected bibliography
Lombardo's Law (1993)
Noticing Paradise (1995)
Hard Love (1999), Michael L. Printz Award Honor book. This book also won the Lambda Literary Award.
What's In a Name (2000), Massachusetts Book Award
Gracie's Girl (2000)
Razzle (2001)
The Long Night of Leo and Bree (2002) - "Although the characters sometimes slip into preaching about women’s rights and men’s feelings, this slim volume packs a punch. Wittlinger (Razzle, 2001, etc.)—always tops at hard-hitting, realistic fiction—delivers another story of teenagers’ self-discovery in a difficult world."
ZigZag (2003) - "Disappointingly conventional fare from the author of Hard Love; still, touched with Wittlinger’s trademark class-consciousness, well-written, and emotionally powerful."
Heart on My Sleeve (2004) - "This modern epistolary tale (emails and IMs joining handwritten letters and postcards) is voyeuristically enjoyable.  A successful use of multiple viewpoints and an interesting exploration of the implied intimacy of various forms of non-verbal communication."
Sandpiper (2005)
Blind Faith (2006) - "An issue-driven story overtly strives for a message and debate on how to define God.  But the presentation is often heavy-handed; the subtleties come toward the end—again at the behest of Liz. Lots of grief, little humor and a character who is so stable that readers might be surprised to realize she’s a character who defines for a new age the concept of “hero.”"
Parrotfish (2007) - Lambda Literary Award Nominee. - "Artistically bland, but direct and respectful. Given the rarity of transgender characters, a vital and necessary purchase for any YA collection."
Love & Lies: Marisol's Story (2008) - "A rich and solid representation of a girl on the cusp of maturity."
This Means War! (2010) - "The characters are solid and believable, while the dialogue is fresh, poignant and funny.  Will appeal to fans of Phyllis Reynolds Naylor’s The Boys Start the War (1993) and The Girls Get Even (1994). "
"Local Girl Swept Away" (2016)

See also

 Phyllis Reynolds Naylor

References

External links
 Author's website
 Short biography on the author's website

1948 births
2022 deaths
People from Belleville, Illinois
Writers from Illinois
Millikin University alumni
University of Iowa alumni
Iowa Writers' Workshop alumni
American writers of young adult literature
Lambda Literary Award for Children's and Young Adult Literature winners
American women novelists
Women writers of young adult literature
20th-century American novelists
20th-century American women writers
21st-century American women